Gouna is a village and rural commune in Niger.

History
The rural community Gouna was founded in 2002 as part of a nationwide administrative reform from the Canton Gouna. During floods in 2008, 887 inhabitants were classified as injured. 37 houses were destroyed and 37 fields were flooded.

Population
In the 2001 census, there were 39,700 inhabitants in Gouna. In 2010, 53,902 inhabitants were calculated.

References

Communes of Niger
Zinder Region